Paranasal sinuses are a group of four paired air-filled spaces that surround the nasal cavity. The maxillary sinuses are located under the eyes; the frontal sinuses are above the eyes; the ethmoidal sinuses are between the eyes and the sphenoidal sinuses are behind the eyes. The sinuses are named for the facial bones in which they are located. Their role is disputed and no function has been confirmed.

Structure
Humans possess four pairs of paranasal sinuses, divided into subgroups that are named according to the bones within which the sinuses lie. They are all innervated by branches of the trigeminal nerve (CN V).
 The maxillary sinuses, the largest of the paranasal sinuses, are under the eyes, in the maxillary bones (open in the back of the semilunar hiatus of the nose). They are innervated by the maxillary nerve (CN V2).
 The frontal sinuses, superior to the eyes, in the frontal bone, which forms the hard part of the forehead. They are innervated by the ophthalmic nerve (CN V1).
 The ethmoidal sinuses, which are formed from several discrete air cells within the ethmoid bone between the nose and the eyes. They are innervated by the ethmoidal nerves, which branch from the nasociliary nerve of the ophthalmic nerve (CN V1).
 The sphenoidal sinuses, in the sphenoid bone. They are innervated by the ophthalmic and maxillary nerve (CN V1 and V2).

The paranasal sinuses are lined with respiratory epithelium (ciliated pseudostratified columnar epithelium).

Functions
One known function of the paranasal sinuses is the production of nitric oxide, which also functions as a facilitator of oxygen uptake.

Development
Paranasal sinuses form developmentally through excavation of bone by air-filled sacs (pneumatic diverticula) from the nasal cavity. This process begins prenatally (intrauterine life), and it continues through the course of an organism's lifetime.

The results of experimental studies suggest that the natural ventilation rate of a sinus with a single sinus ostium (opening) is extremely slow. Such limited ventilation may be protective for the sinus, as it would help prevent drying of its mucosal surface and maintain a near-sterile environment with high carbon dioxide concentrations and minimal pathogen access. Thus composition of gas content in the maxillary sinus is similar to venous blood, with high carbon dioxide and lower oxygen levels compared to breathing air.

At birth, only the maxillary sinus and the ethmoid sinus are developed but not yet pneumatized; only by the age of seven they are fully aerated. The sphenoid sinus appears at the age of three, and the frontal sinuses first appear at the age of six, and fully develop during adulthood.

CT scans, radiographs (x-ray) and other illustrations

Clinical significance

Inflammation

The paranasal sinuses are joined to the nasal cavity via small orifices called ostia. These become blocked easily by allergic inflammation, or by swelling in the nasal lining that occurs with a cold. If this happens, normal drainage of mucus within the sinuses is disrupted, and sinusitis may occur. Because the maxillary posterior teeth are close to the maxillary sinus, this can also cause clinical problems if any disease processes are present, such as an infection in any of these teeth. These clinical problems can include secondary sinusitis, the inflammation of the sinuses from another source such as an infection of the adjacent teeth.

These conditions may be treated with drugs such as decongestants, which cause vasoconstriction in the sinuses; reducing inflammation; by traditional techniques of nasal irrigation; or by corticosteroid.

Cancer
Malignancies of the paranasal sinuses comprise approximately 0.2% of all malignancies. About 80% of these malignancies arise in the maxillary sinus. Men are much more often affected than women. They most often occur in the age group between 40 and 70 years. Carcinomas are more frequent than sarcomas. Metastases are rare. Tumours of the sphenoid and frontal sinuses are extremely rare.

Etymology
Sinus is a Latin word meaning a "fold", "curve", or "bay". Compare sine.

Other animals
Paranasal sinuses occur in many other animals, including most mammals, birds, non-avian dinosaurs, and crocodilians. The bones occupied by sinuses are quite variable in these other species.

Illustrations

See also

References

External links

Human head and neck
Bones of the head and neck